(1868–1934) was a Japanese film promoter and producer who financially supported Sun Yat-sen's revolutionary activities over a period of nearly 20 years. He was the founder in 1906 of the early Japanese film production company M. Pathe.

See also

 Tōten Miyazaki, another Japanese supporter of Sun Yat-sen.

References

Further reading

External links 
 "Sun Yat-sen And Umeya Shokichi: China And Japan 100 Years Ago" The Japan Times Online, 22/07/2011
 "30 years of friendship on show in Japan", China Daily, 10/10/2011
 "A Bosom Japanese Friend of Sun Yat-sen - The Unveiling of Bronze Statue of Umeya Shokichi Held in Shanghai", Foreign Affairs Office of Shanghai Municipality, 07/11/2011

Japanese film producers
1868 births
1934 deaths
Japanese expatriates in Hong Kong